Language equations are mathematical statements that resemble numerical equations, but the variables assume values of formal languages rather than numbers. Instead of arithmetic operations in numerical equations, the variables are joined by language operations. Among the most common operations on two languages A and B are the set union A ∪ B, the set intersection A ∩ B, and the concatenation A⋅B. Finally, as an operation taking a single operand, the set A* denotes the Kleene star of the language A. Therefore language equations can be used to represent formal grammars, since the languages generated by the grammar must be the solution of a system of language equations.

Language equations and context-free grammars

Ginsburg and Rice
gave an alternative definition of context-free grammars by language equations. To every context-free grammar , is associated a system of equations in variables .

For example, the grammar 

corresponds to the equation system

Language equations with added intersection analogously correspond to conjunctive grammars.

Language equations and finite automata

Brzozowski and Leiss studied left language equations where every concatenation is with a singleton constant language on the left, e.g.  with variable , but not  nor . Each equation is of the form  with one variable on the right-hand side. Every nondeterministic finite automaton has such corresponding equation using left-concatenation and union, see Fig. 1. If intersection operation is allowed, equations correspond to alternating finite automata.

Baader and Narendran studied equations  using left-concatenation and union and proved that their satisfiability problem is EXPTIME-complete.

Conway's problem

Conway proposed the following problem: given a constant finite language , is the greatest solution of the equation  always regular? This problem was studied by Karhumäki and Petre who gave an affirmative answer in a special case. A strongly negative answer to Conway's problem was given by Kunc who constructed a finite language  such that the greatest solution of this equation is not recursively enumerable.

Kunc also proved that the greatest solution of inequality  is always regular.

Language equations with Boolean operations

Language equations with concatenation and Boolean operations were first studied by Parikh, Chandra, Halpern and Meyer
 who proved that the satisfiability problem for a given equation is undecidable, and that if a system of language equations has a unique solution, then that solution is recursive. Later, Okhotin proved that the unsatisfiability problem is RE-complete and that every recursive language is a unique solution of some equation.

Language equations over a unary alphabet

For a one-letter alphabet, Leiss discovered the first language equation with a nonregular solution, using complementation and concatenation operations. Later, Jeż showed that non-regular unary languages can be defined by language equations with union, intersection and concatenation, equivalent to conjunctive grammars. By this method Jeż and Okhotin proved that every recursive unary language is a unique solution of some equation.

See also
 Boolean grammar
 Arden's rule
 Set constraint

References

External links
 Workshop on Theory and Applications of Language Equations (TALE 2007)

Formal languages
Equations